The 1952 Pacific hurricane season ran through the summer and fall of 1952. Of the seven known tropical cyclones, all remained at sea.

Systems

Tropical Storm One

Tropical Storm One existed from May 29 to May 31.

Tropical Storm Two

Tropical Storm Two existed from June 12 to June 16.

Tropical Storm Three

Tropical Storm Three existed from July 19 to July 21.

Hurricane Four

Hurricane Four remained at sea.

Hurricane Five

A hurricane developed on September 15 southwest of Baja California and dissipated seven days later. Moisture from Five produced  of rainfall in the deserts and mountains of central and southern California.

Tropical Storm Six

Tropical Storm Six existed from September 26 to September 28.

Hurricane Seven

Hurricane Seven existed from October 13 to October 15.

See also
List of Pacific hurricanes
Pacific hurricane season
1952 Atlantic hurricane season
1952 Pacific typhoon season
 Australian region cyclone seasons: 1952–53 1953–54
 South Pacific cyclone seasons: 1952–53 1953–54
 South-West Indian Ocean cyclone seasons: 1952–53 1953–54

References